Clinton–Rosekrans Law Building is a historic law office at Greene in Chenango County, New York. It was built in 1892 and is a simple two story brick structure with an ornate, galvanized iron front. It measures 40 feet wide and 60 feet deep, with a frame second story porch in the rear. It is located within the Greene Historic District.

It was added to the National Register of Historic Places in 1979.

See also 
 Acker and Evans Law Office: NRHP listing in Ogdensburg, New York
 Heermance House and Law Office: NRHP listing in Rhinecliff, New York
 National Register of Historic Places listings in Chenango County, New York

References

Office buildings on the National Register of Historic Places in New York (state)
Commercial buildings completed in 1892
Buildings and structures in Chenango County, New York
National Register of Historic Places in Chenango County, New York
Law offices
Legal history of New York (state)
1892 establishments in New York (state)
Neoclassical architecture in New York (state)
Individually listed contributing properties to historic districts on the National Register in New York (state)